Kleinbettingen railway station is a railway station serving Kleinbettingen, in the commune of Steinfort, in western Luxembourg.  It is operated by Chemins de Fer Luxembourgeois, the state-owned railway company.

The station is situated on Line 50, which connects Luxembourg City to the west of the country and the Belgian town of Arlon.

External links
 Official CFL page on Kleinbettingen station
 Rail.lu page on Kleinbettingen station

Steinfort
Railway stations in Luxembourg
Railway stations on CFL Line 50